Wendi Schneider (born 1955) is an American artist and photographer based in Denver, Colorado, known for her photographs of nature and wildlife that are often printed on paper vellum or kozo with hand-applied layers of gold leaf on verso. Gilded vellum and kozo photographs from her ongoing "States of Grace" series have been exhibited in more than 100 gallery and museum exhibitions nationally and abroad. Paula Tognarelli, executive director of the Griffin Museum of Photography, has stated: "There is an elegance that emanates from Wendi Schneider's photographs. It can be seen in the turn of a flamingo's neck, in hanging fog or the flick of a betta fish tail. Schneider's photographic gestures are not rare sightings but daily gifts from the natural world for those with the patience to see them."

Life and early career

Born in Memphis, TN in 1955, Schneider attended Stephens College in Columbia, Missouri where she studied Art History, before moving on to Newcomb College in 1975 to study Studio Art. Painting was her chosen medium at this time, and her first use of a camera was to make reference photographs of painting subjects. When she shifted her artistic focus to photography, she sought to integrate her painting background by layering paints and glazes on her photographic prints to "create a more personal impression." After college, she remained in New Orleans and worked for The Times-Picayune, where she photographed, designed, and produced the award-winning 1987 edition of The Picayune's Creole Cook Book. The following year, Schneider moved to New York City, where she photographed for Victoria Magazine while continuing her fine art photography work During this time, her work often appeared on book covers for authors such as Louisa May Alcott, Anne Rice, Tami Hoag, Iris Johansen, Jodi Thomas and more. In 1991, she exhibited a collection of hand-painted photographs titled Mille Fleur at A Gallery for Fine Photography in New Orleans, which continues to represent her work. In 1994, she left New York for Denver, where she still lives today, and later put her fine art practice on hold while she raised her son and worked in commissioned photography, art direction, and design.

Fine art photography

In 2010,  Schneider was inspired to return her fine art roots; a return visit to A Gallery for Fine Photography in New Orleans cemented the desire to revive her fine art photography practice. Soon after, she began work on her ongoing States of Grace series, and its three attendant sub-series – Flora, Fauna, and Figura – which illustrate Schneider's "affinity for wildlife and the natural world". Schneider is known for the gilding effect she uses in this series, wherein "images are captured, layered and printed digitally with archival pigment ink on paper vellum or kozo, and white gold, 24k gold or silver leaf is then hand-applied to the back of the print, creating a silken sheen on the print's surface." States of Grace has traveled worldwide.

Schneider's most recent series, Evenings with the Moon "engages the moon as muse." Images in this series are printed on paper vellum or Japanese kozo paper and gilded with gold leaf. As of January 2020 Evenings with the Moon has been shown at the Southeast Center for Photography in Greenville, SC; and The Gallery at Mr. Pool in Boulder, CO.

Schneider has been selected as a Finalist for Photolucida's international juried exhibition Critical Mass in 2017, 2018, and 2020. She has taught workshops at the Southeast Center for Photography and A Smith Gallery.

Awards
 2014: Black & White Magazine, Best Single Image, Animals
 2016: International Color Awards, 2nd Place, Merit of Excellence Wildlife
 2016: San Diego Natural History Museum Best of Nature, First place
 2016: 9th Annual Julia Margaret Cameron Awards, Single Image, Nude/Figure
 2017: Neutral Density Photography Awards, Honorable Mention
 2017: Florida Museum of Photographic Arts, International Exhibit, Third place, Nature, Science, and Animals
 2017: Animalia, Director's Selection, The Center for Fine Art Photography
 2017: Gala Awards, First place, Urban & Rural Landscape
 2018: National Association of Women Artists, Silver, Small Works, Works on Paper
 2018: American Photography 34
 2018: Moscow International Photo Awards, Bronze, Nature
 2018: Prix de la Photographie, Paris (Px3), Bronze, Fine Art, Landscape
 2019: San Francisco Bay Month of Photography, Gold
 2020: Px3, Nature/Trees, Gold

References

External links
 

1955 births
Living people
H. Sophie Newcomb Memorial College alumni
American women photographers
21st-century American women